Guillermo Díaz Carmona (born 25 June 1926) was a Chilean footballer. He played in twelve matches for the Chile national football team from 1952 to 1955. He was also part of Chile's squad for the 1953 South American Championship.

References

External links
 

1926 births
Possibly living people
Chilean footballers
Chile international footballers
Association football forwards
Santiago Morning footballers
Footballers from Santiago